Jouy may refer to:

Communes in France
Jouy, Eure-et-Loir, in the Eure-et-Loir département
Jouy, Yonne, in the Yonne département
Jouy-aux-Arches, in the Moselle département
Jouy-en-Argonne, in the Meuse département 
Jouy-en-Josas, in the Yvelines département
Jouy-en-Pithiverais, in the Loiret département 
Jouy-le-Châtel, in the Seine-et-Marne département 
Jouy-le-Moutier, in the Val-d'Oise département 
Jouy-le-Potier, in the Loiret département
Jouy-lès-Reims, in the Marne département 
Jouy-Mauvoisin, in the Yvelines département
Jouy-sous-Thelle, in the Oise département 
Jouy-sur-Eure, in the Eure département 
Jouy-sur-Morin, in the Seine-et-Marne département

Persons
Victor Joseph Etienne de Jouy, a French dramatist